Kelly Williams is a Filipino-American basketball player.

Kelly Williams may also refer to:

 Kelli Williams, American actress
 Kellie Shanygne Williams, American actress
 Kelli Williams (musician), musician
 Kelly Williams Brown, American writer
 Kelly Williamson, American athlete